FC Arsenal Tula is a Russian professional football club from Tula playing in the second-tier Russian First League. 

Originally founded in 1923, FC Arsenal Tula was promoted to the Russian Premier League in 2014 for the first time in its history after finishing as runners-up in the 2013–14 Russian National Football League. This achievement marked three successive promotions for the club. On its debut season in the 2014–15 Russian Premier League, it finished in last place and was relegated back to the FNL. The club spent one season in the FNL before returning to the Premier League for the 2016–17 season, in which they have competed since. The club was relegated at the end of the 2021–22 Russian Premier League after taking last place.

The team currently plays its home games in Arsenal Stadium, which has a capacity of 19,241.

History

Team name history
 1946–58: FC Zenit Tula
 1959–61: FC Trud Tula
 1962–63: FC Shakhtyor Tula
 1964–74: FC Metallurg Tula
 1975–79: FC Mashinostroitel Tula
 1980–83: FC TOZ Tula
 1984–2006: FC Arsenal Tula
 2007: FC Oruzheynik Tula (formed based on the squad and staff of FC Arsenal Tula, but was not a legal successor to Arsenal)
 2008–11: FC Arsenal-Tula (formed based on the squad and staff of FC Oruzheynik Tula, but was not a legal successor to Oruzheynik)
 2011–: FC Arsenal Tula

Early Years
Arsenal Tula played their first season in the USSR Championship in 1946 under the name Zenit Tula, competing in the Central Division of the RSFSR Championship and finished 5th in their debut season. The precursors to Arsenal Tula played mainly in the Soviet Second League and never played in the Soviet Top League. The club was the champions of Zone West of the Russian Professional Football League in 1997 and 2003 and competed in the Russian Football National League from 1998 until 2001 and in 2004. In 2005, Arsenal Tula did not receive an FNL license due to financial difficulties and once again competed in Zone West in the PFL. In 2006 the team FC Arsenal Tula was liquidated and FC Oruzheynik Tula was formed in its place, playing in the Amateur Division. In 2011, it was announced that the team FC Arsenal Tula would be reformed.

Recent history
The present day team FC Arsenal Tula was formed at the end of 2011, replacing the former team FC Arsenal-Tula. The first coach of Arsenal was the famous Russian footballer Dmitri Alenichev and the coaching staff included Dmitri Ananko, Oleg Samatov, and famous goalkeeper Aleksandr Filimonov. The club's initial squad also had several famous players such as midfielder Yegor Titov and defender Dmytro Parfenov. Over the course of the 2011/12 season, Arsenal finished in 8th place in the Russian Amateur Football League and all of the famous footballers left the club. Trainer Dmitri Alenichev decided to replace them with young players.

On June 18, 2012, Arsenal received a license to compete in Zone Center in the 2012–13 Russian Second Division. Arsenal won promotion at their first attempt, finishing the season with 73 points and 22 wins, 7 draws, and just 1 loss. In the 2013–14 season, FC Arsenal Tula were promoted once again, finishing as runners-up and being promoted to the Russian Premier League for the first time in their history. Over the course of the 2014–15 Russian Premier League, Arsenal finished in last place with 25 points and were relegated back to the FNL. During this season, on April 9, 2015 Arsenal had a sensational 1–0 victory over Spartak Moscow. In this match, the fans of Spartak climbed onto the roof of Arsenal Stadium despite it being unsafe and one fan was hospitalized. This match resulted in the club being fined 500,000 rubles and being forced to play their next match against Krasnodar at a neutral venue. In the 2014–15 Russian Cup, Arsenal reached the quarterfinals, beating Zenit Saint Petersburg in their home stadium.

Before the beginning of the 2015–16 season, trainer Dmitri Alenichev left for Spartak Moscow and was replaced by Viktor Bulatov. Viktor Bulatov was sacked after 24 games, with the club having won 14, drawn 4, and lost 6 games under his tenure. Bulatov was replaced by Sergei Pavlov, who led Arsenal back to the Premier League, with the club finishing as runners-up with 82 points. In the 2016–17 Russian Premier League, Arsenal started poorly, and in October 2016, Pavlov was sacked and replaced with Sergei Kiriakov. Arsenal finished in 14th place and advanced to the relegation play-offs against Yenisey Krasnoyarsk, which Arsenal survived and stayed in the Premier League because of the away goals rule, as Arsenal had won 1–0 in Tula and lost 2–1 in Krasnoyarsk. In the 2017–18 season Arsenal hired Miodrag Božović, who led them to their highest ever position of 7th in the Premier League. Božović left Arsenal after one year. Oleg Kononov took over as the manager, but also left after 5 months at the helm. Igor Cherevchenko eventually led them to 6th place in the 2018–19 season, which qualified them for the very first time for the European competition, 2019–20 UEFA Europa League.

League and Cup history

Soviet Union
{|class="wikitable"
|- style="background:#efefef;"
! Season
! Div.
! Pos.
! Pl.
! W
! D
! L
! GS
! GA
! P
!Cup
|-
|align=center|1946
|align=center|3rd, "Center"
|align=center|5
|align=center|16
|align=center|8
|align=center|0
|align=center|8
|align=center|38
|align=center|49
|align=center|16
|align=center|
|-
| style="text-align:center;" colspan="11"|1947–1948
|-
|align=center|1949
|align=center|2nd, RSFSR-4
|align=center|13
|align=center|26
|align=center|6
|align=center|5
|align=center|15
|align=center|36
|align=center|66
|align=center|17
|align=center|
|-
| style="text-align:center;" colspan="11"|1950–1958
|-
|align=center|1959
|align=center|2nd, Zone 2
|align=center|13
|align=center|28
|align=center|5
|align=center|8
|align=center|15
|align=center|26
|align=center|44
|align=center|18
|align=center|
|-
|align=center|1960
| style="text-align:center;" rowspan="4"|2nd, RSFSR-Zone 1
|align=center|8
|align=center|30
|align=center|11
|align=center|6
|align=center|13
|align=center|39
|align=center|43
|align=center|28
|align=center|R64
|-
|align=center|1961
|align=center|6
|align=center|24
|align=center|11
|align=center|6
|align=center|7
|align=center|36
|align=center|22
|align=center|28
|align=center|R128
|-
|align=center|1962
|align=center|10
|align=center|32
|align=center|11
|align=center|8
|align=center|13
|align=center|32
|align=center|45
|align=center|30
|align=center|R256
|-
|align=center|1963
|align=center|11
|align=center|30
|align=center|9
|align=center|8
|align=center|13
|align=center|30
|align=center|35
|align=center|26
|align=center|R512
|-
|align=center|1964
|align=center|3rd, RSFSR-Zone 2
|align=center|12
|align=center|32
|align=center|8
|align=center|12
|align=center|12
|align=center|31
|align=center|38
|align=center|28
|align=center|R64
|-
|align=center|1965
| style="text-align:center;" rowspan="2"|3rd, RSFSR-Zone 1
|align=center|9
|align=center|34
|align=center|11
|align=center|13
|align=center|10
|align=center|38
|align=center|24
|align=center|35
|align=center|R1024
|-
| style="text-align:center;" rowspan="3"|1966
|align=center|2
|align=center|32
|align=center|15
|align=center|13
|align=center|4
|align=center|33
|align=center|15
|align=center|43
| style="text-align:center;" rowspan="3"|R512
|-
|align=center|3rd, Semi-final
|align=center|1
|align=center|4
|align=center|2
|align=center|1
|align=center|1
|align=center|3
|align=center|2
|align=center|5
|-
|align=center|3rd, Final
|  style="text-align:center; background:lightgreen;"|3
|align=center|3
|align=center|1
|align=center|0
|align=center|2
|align=center|4
|align=center|5
|align=center|2
|-
|align=center|1967
| style="text-align:center;" rowspan="4"|2nd (Group 2)
|align=center|13
|align=center|38
|align=center|9
|align=center|18
|align=center|11
|align=center|26
|align=center|35
|align=center|36
|align=center|R512
|-
|align=center|1968
|align=center|14
|align=center|40
|align=center|9
|align=center|16
|align=center|15
|align=center|31
|align=center|40
|align=center|34
|align=center|R256
|-
|align=center|1969
|align=center|5
|align=center|38
|align=center|12
|align=center|19
|align=center|7
|align=center|36
|align=center|25
|align=center|43
|align=center|R128
|-
|align=center|1970
|align=center|4
|align=center|42
|align=center|21
|align=center|11
|align=center|10
|align=center|80
|align=center|38
|align=center|53
|align=center|R16
|-
|align=center|1971
| style="text-align:center;" rowspan="2"|3rd, Zone 2
|align=center|2
|align=center|38
|align=center|23
|align=center|8
|align=center|7
|align=center|58
|align=center|28
|align=center|77
|align=center|
|-
|align=center|1972
|align=center|12
|align=center|38
|align=center|12
|align=center|10
|align=center|16
|align=center|47
|align=center|51
|align=center|46
|align=center|
|-
|align=center|1973
|align=center|3rd, Zone 3
|align=center|16
|align=center|34
|align=center|7
|align=center|8
|align=center|19
|align=center|37
|align=center|61
|align=center|19
|align=center|
|-
|align=center|1974
|align=center|3rd, Zone 2
|align=center|10
|align=center|40
|align=center|15
|align=center|11
|align=center|14
|align=center|42
|align=center|51
|align=center|41
|align=center|
|-
|align=center|1975
| style="text-align:center;" rowspan="2"|3rd, Zone 3
|align=center|19
|align=center|38
|align=center|9
|align=center|10
|align=center|19
|align=center|29
|align=center|51
|align=center|28
|align=center|
|-
|align=center|1976
|align=center|18
|align=center|40
|align=center|6
|align=center|12
|align=center|22
|align=center|26
|align=center|57
|align=center|24
|align=center|
|-
|align=center|1977
|align=center|3rd, Zone 1
|align=center|10
|align=center|40
|align=center|16
|align=center|9
|align=center|15
|align=center|51
|align=center|34
|align=center|41
|align=center|
|-
|align=center|1978
|align=center|3rd, Zone 3
|align=center|24
|align=center|46
|align=center|8
|align=center|11
|align=center|27
|align=center|39
|align=center|70
|align=center|27
|align=center|
|-
|align=center|1979
| style="text-align:center;" rowspan="11"|3rd, Zone 1
|align=center|19
|align=center|46
|align=center|8
|align=center|18
|align=center|20
|align=center|41
|align=center|72
|align=center|34
|align=center|
|-
|align=center|1980
|align=center|8
|align=center|36
|align=center|19
|align=center|5
|align=center|12
|align=center|66
|align=center|43
|align=center|43
|align=center|
|-
|align=center|1981
|align=center|17
|align=center|32
|align=center|4
|align=center|5
|align=center|23
|align=center|25
|align=center|67
|align=center|13
|align=center|
|-
|align=center|1982
|align=center|15
|align=center|30
|align=center|6
|align=center|6
|align=center|18
|align=center|24
|align=center|56
|align=center|18
|align=center|
|-
|align=center|1983
|align=center|11
|align=center|30
|align=center|9
|align=center|9
|align=center|12
|align=center|27
|align=center|31
|align=center|27
|align=center|
|-
|align=center|1984
|align=center|3
|align=center|32
|align=center|19
|align=center|5
|align=center|8
|align=center|56
|align=center|29
|align=center|43
|align=center|
|-
|align=center|1985
|align=center|4
|align=center|32
|align=center|15
|align=center|12
|align=center|5
|align=center|50
|align=center|34
|align=center|42
|align=center|R32
|-
|align=center|1986
|align=center|2
|align=center|30
|align=center|17
|align=center|7
|align=center|6
|align=center|39
|align=center|19
|align=center|41
| style="text-align:center;" rowspan="2"|R64
|-
|align=center|1987
|align=center|12
|align=center|32
|align=center|8
|align=center|9
|align=center|15
|align=center|29
|align=center|40
|align=center|25
|-
|align=center|1988
|align=center|16
|align=center|38
|align=center|12
|align=center|7
|align=center|19
|align=center|56
|align=center|61
|align=center|31
|align=center|
|-
|align=center|1989
|  style="text-align:center; background:pink;"|15
|align=center|42
|align=center|15
|align=center|6
|align=center|21
|align=center|41
|align=center|46
|align=center|36
|align=center|
|-
|align=center|1990
| style="text-align:center;" rowspan="2"|4th, Zone 5
|align=center|15
|align=center|32
|align=center|8
|align=center|8
|align=center|16
|align=center|31
|align=center|48
|align=center|24
|align=center|
|-
|align=center|1991
|align=center|12
|align=center|42
|align=center|19
|align=center|7
|align=center|16
|align=center|54
|align=center|41
|align=center|45
|align=center|
|}

Russia
{|class="wikitable"
|- style="background:#efefef;"
! Season
! Div.
! Pos.
! Pl.
! W
! D
! L
! GS
! GA
! P
!Cup
|-
|align=center|1992
|align=center|3rd, Zone 2
|align=center|7
|align=center|42
|align=center|22
|align=center|7
|align=center|13
|align=center|56
|align=center|45
|align=center|51
| style="text-align:center;" rowspan="3"|R16
|-
|align=center|1993
|align=center|3rd, Zone 3
|align=center|2
|align=center|34
|align=center|21
|align=center|7
|align=center|6
|align=center|58
|align=center|15
|align=center|49
|-
|align=center|1994
| style="text-align:center;" rowspan="3"|3rd, Zone Center
|align=center|9
|align=center|32
|align=center|14
|align=center|7
|align=center|11
|align=center|47
|align=center|33
|align=center|35
|-
|align=center|1995
|align=center|6
|align=center|40
|align=center|19
|align=center|10
|align=center|11
|align=center|61
|align=center|43
|align=center|67
| style="text-align:center;" rowspan="2"|R256
|-
|align=center|1996
|align=center|4
|align=center|42
|align=center|29
|align=center|5
|align=center|8
|align=center|79
|align=center|36
|align=center|92
|-
|align=center|1997
|align=center|3rd, Zone West
|  style="text-align:center; background:lightgreen;"|1
|align=center|38
|align=center|28
|align=center|7
|align=center|3
|align=center|91
|align=center|26
|align=center|91
|align=center|R16
|-
|align=center|1998
| style="text-align:center;" rowspan="4"|2nd
|align=center|5
|align=center|42
|align=center|18
|align=center|11
|align=center|13
|align=center|65
|align=center|53
|align=center|65
|align=center|QF
|-
|align=center|1999
|align=center|9
|align=center|42
|align=center|19
|align=center|7
|align=center|16
|align=center|61
|align=center|51
|align=center|64
|align=center|R32
|-
|align=center|2000
|align=center|11
|align=center|38
|align=center|13
|align=center|13
|align=center|12
|align=center|45
|align=center|39
|align=center|52
|align=center|QF
|-
|align=center|2001
|  style="text-align:center; background:pink;"|16
|align=center|34
|align=center|10
|align=center|10
|align=center|14
|align=center|27
|align=center|35
|align=center|40
|align=center|R32
|-
|align=center|2002
| style="text-align:center;" rowspan="2"|3rd, Zone West
|align=center|2
|align=center|38
|align=center|23
|align=center|8
|align=center|7
|align=center|66
|align=center|29
|align=center|77
|align=center|R256
|-
|align=center|2003
|  style="text-align:center; background:lightgreen;"|1
|align=center|36
|align=center|26
|align=center|5
|align=center|5
|align=center|83
|align=center|18
|align=center|83
| style="text-align:center;" rowspan="2"|R32
|-
|align=center|2004
|align=center|2nd
|  style="text-align:center; background:pink;"|13
|align=center|42
|align=center|15
|align=center|13
|align=center|14
|align=center|39
|align=center|32
|align=center|58
|-
|align=center|2005
| style="text-align:center;" rowspan="2"|3rd, Zone West
|align=center|13
|align=center|32
|align=center|8
|align=center|8
|align=center|16
|align=center|26
|align=center|31
|align=center|32
|align=center|R256
|-
|align=center|2006
|  style="text-align:center; background:pink;"|18
|align=center|34
|align=center|7
|align=center|4
|align=center|23
|align=center|26
|align=center|58
|align=center|25
|align=center|R512
|-
|align=center|2007
| style="text-align:center;" rowspan="5"|4th, Zone Central - Black Earth Region
|align=center|2
|align=center|32
|align=center|18
|align=center|9
|align=center|5
|align=center|71
|align=center|21
|align=center|63
|align=center|
|-
|align=center|2008
|align=center|5
|align=center|34
|align=center|21
|align=center|8
|align=center|5
|align=center|75
|align=center|27
|align=center|71
|align=center|
|-
|align=center|2009
|align=center|7
|align=center|24
|align=center|12
|align=center|3
|align=center|9
|align=center|40
|align=center|24
|align=center|39
|align=center|
|-
|align=center|2010
|align=center|5
|align=center|22
|align=center|11
|align=center|2
|align=center|9
|align=center|27
|align=center|25
|align=center|35
|align=center|
|-
|align=center|2011–12
|  style="text-align:center; background:lightgreen;"|8
|align=center|42
|align=center|18
|align=center|10
|align=center|14
|align=center|58
|align=center|43
|align=center|64
|align=center|
|-
|align=center|2012–13
|align=center|3rd, Zone Center
|  style="text-align:center; background:lightgreen;"|1
|align=center|30
|align=center|22
|align=center|7
|align=center|1
|align=center|74
|align=center|20
|align=center|73
|align=center|R256
|-
|align=center|2013–14
|align=center|2nd
|  style="text-align:center; background:lightgreen;"|2
|align=center|36
|align=center|21
|align=center|6
|align=center|9
|align=center|62
|align=center|39
|align=center|69
|align=center|R64
|-
|align=center|2014–15
|align=center|1st
|  style="text-align:center; background:pink;"|16
|align=center|30
|align=center|7
|align=center|4
|align=center|19
|align=center|20
|align=center|46
|align=center|25
|align=center|QF
|-
|align=center|2015–16
|align=center|2nd
|  style="text-align:center; background:lightgreen;"|2
|align=center|38
|align=center|25
|align=center|7
|align=center|6
|align=center|64
|align=center|36
|align=center|82
|align=center|R64
|-
|align=center|2016–17
| style="text-align:center;" rowspan="4"|1st
|align=center|14
|align=center|30
|align=center|7
|align=center|7
|align=center|16
|align=center|18
|align=center|40
|align=center|28
| style="text-align:center;" rowspan="2"|R32
|-
|align=center|2017–18
|align=center|7
|align=center|30
|align=center|12
|align=center|6
|align=center|12
|align=center|35
|align=center|41
|align=center|42
|-
|align=center|2018–19
|align=center|6
|align=center|30
|align=center|12
|align=center|10
|align=center|8
|align=center|40
|align=center|33
|align=center|46
|align=center|SF
|-
|align=center|2019–20
|align=center|8
|align=center|30
|align=center|11
|align=center|5
|align=center|14
|align=center|37
|align=center|41
|align=center|38
|align=center|R16
|}

European record

As of 1 August 2019

Notes
 QR: Qualifying round

Feeder club
Arsenal's feeder club Arsenal-2 Tula participated in the third tier of professional Russian football, Russian Professional Football League, beginning with the 2014–15 season. The club was dissolved after the 2016–17 season. Another team was called Arsenal-2 and competed professionally from 1998 to 2002, it last competed as Dynamo Tula.

Supporters 

Traditionally, the games of Arsenal have drawn great interest from the local football loving population. In the 2011–12 season, when Arsenal was still an amateur team, over 13,500 fans showed up for a match between Arsenal and Rusichi, which is an attendance record for a Russian amateur game. In the second division, FC Arsenal Tula's attendance was over 8,000 people on average. According to data collected by the Russian Football Union in 2013, Arsenal's attendance was 15th out of 106 professional clubs in Russia. In the FNL, the average attendance of Arsenal was 10,844, with over 16,500 people showing up for the key game against Torpedo Moscow. In Arsenal's first season in the Premier League, the average attendance was 12,154.

There are several ultras groups among Arsenal fans including the well-known Red-Yellow Cannoneers. The shirt number 12 has been permanently retired by the club management in honor of the fans.

Current squad
As of 14 February 2023, according to the FNL website.

Coaching staff
 Head coach – Aleksandr_Storozhuk
 Assistant coach – Georgy Sakhvadze
 Goalkeeping coach – Denis Pchelintsev
 Conditioning coach – Anton Antonov

Honours
Russian National Football League: 
Runners-Up (2): 2013–14, 2015–16

Russian Professional Football League: 
Winners Zone West (2): 1997, 2003
Winners Zone Center (1): 2012–13

Notable players
Had international caps for their respective countries. Players whose name is listed in bold represented their countries while playing for Arsenal.

Russia/USSR
 Zelimkhan Bakayev
 Maksim Belyayev
 Taras Burlak
 Artyom Dzyuba
 Vadim Evseev
 Aleksandr Filimonov
 Sergei Filippenkov
 Vladimir Gabulov
 Dmitri Khlestov
 Daniil Khlusevich
 Valeri Kleymyonov
   Dmitri Kuznetsov
 Yuri Lodygin
 Ilya Maksimov
 Ramiz Mamedov
  Mukhsin Mukhamadiev
 Ivan Novoseltsev
 Kirill Panchenko
 Aleksandr Sheshukov
 Valeri Shmarov
 Egor Titov

Europe
 Tigran Petrosyants
 Vladislav Kadyrov
 Dzmitry Balashow
 Valeriy Gromyko
 Uladzimir Karytska
 Yury Kavalyow
 Andrei Kovalenko
 Maksim Valadzko
 Zoran Amidžić 
 Mihail Aleksandrov
 Ivan Ivanov
 Georgi Kostadinov
 Gia Grigalava
 Edik Sajaia
 Konstantin Ledovskikh
 Viktor Zubarev
 Aleksandrs Jeļisejevs
 Darius Gvildys
 Valeriu Catînsus
 Luka Đorđević
 Mladen Kašćelan
 Goran Vujović

 Alexandru Bourceanu
 Florin Costea
 Ognjen Ožegović
 Ján Mucha
 Lukáš Tesák
 Yuriy Hrytsyna
 Dmytro Parfyonov
 Oleksandr Pryzetko
 Oleksandr Svystunov
Asia
 Khakim Fuzailov
North America
 Felicio Brown Forbes
Africa
 Bakary Koné 
 Emmanuel Frimpong
 Habib Maïga
 Moussa Doumbia
 Kings Kangwa
 Evans Kangwa
 Stoppila Sunzu

Managers

 Viktor Papayev (1989)
 Aleksei Petrushin (1993–94)
 Anatoli Polosin (1995)
 Gennadi Kostylev (1996)
 Yevhen Kucherevskyi (1997–99)
 Leonid Buryak (1999)
 Vladimir Yurin (1999–00)
 Vladimir Fedotov (2001)
 Boris Stukalov (2004)
 Yury Cheryevsky (2005–06)
 Aleksandr Chimbiryov (2008–11)
 Dmitri Alenichev (2011–15)
 Viktor Bulatov (2015–16)
 Sergei Pavlov (2016)
 Andrei Kozlov (caretaker) (2016)
 Sergei Kiriakov (2016–17)
 Miodrag Božović (2017–2018)
 Oleg Kononov (2018)
 Igor Cherevchenko (2018–2020)
 Sergei Podpaly (2020)
 Dmytro Parfenov (2020–2021)
 Miodrag Božović (2021–2022)
 Oleg Kononov (2022–2023)
 Aleksandr Storozhuk (2023–)

References

External links

 Official fan-club site

 
Association football clubs established in 1946
Football clubs in Russia
Sport in Tula, Russia
1946 establishments in Russia